A registration district in the United Kingdom is a type of administrative region which exists for the purpose of civil registration of births, marriages, and deaths and civil partnerships.  It has also been used as the basis for the collation of census information.

Origin and development of registration districts

England and Wales

Registration districts in England and Wales were created with the introduction of civil registration on 1 July 1837 and were originally co-terminous with poor law unions.  Their existence as autonomous entities came to an end in 1930, when the relevant administrative county or county borough was made responsible.  A subsequent series of reforms of local government has resulted in the responsibility today being held by the relevant county council, unitary authority, metropolitan district, or London borough.

Each district is divided into sub-districts, each of which has a registrar responsible for the registration of births, marriages, civil partnerships, and deaths in his or her area.  Overall responsibility for a district is held by a superintendent registrar.

Registration districts are not always co-terminous with county boundaries, and so in the past were grouped into "registration counties" for statistical purposes. They remained in use for the census from 1851 to 1911.

Scotland

Registration districts in Scotland came into being with the introduction of civil registration there in 1855; away from the cities their boundaries usually coincided with civil parishes. Prior to 1 January 2007, registration districts did not coincide with council areas in many areas; commonly both geographically large and densely populated Council Areas had several registration districts, each with a registrar within easy reach of most residents. The Local Electoral Administration and Registration Services (Scotland) Act 2006 aligned the boundaries of registration districts (or groups thereof) with those of the 32 Scottish council areas. The Act also allows births and deaths to be registered with any registrar in Scotland, rather than solely in the registration district where the event occurred or in the registration district of usual residence.

Ireland
There are approximately 164 Superintendent Registrar's Districts (SRDs) in Ireland and Northern Ireland; some were dissolved, split, or merged in the mid to late 1800s, and a few (such as Fingal) were created in the 1900s.  Many of the SRDs share the name of the Irish county in which most of their land exists:  Specifically, the SRDs of Londonderry, Donegal, Antrim, Sligo, Monaghan, Armagh, Cavan, Longford, Roscommon, Galway, Kilkenny, Carlow, Limerick, Tipperary, Wexford, Waterford, and Cork.  However, the SRDs follow the general outlines of Poor Law Unions that preceded them (see accompanying map), and often overlap across two or more counties.  SRDs are also distinct from civil and ecclesiastical parishes.

When searching for the birth, marriage, or death record of an Irish ancestor, you need to know or at least have a good idea of the specific SRD and townland in order to find the record in the databases.

Starting from the northwestern tip of the island, including both Ireland (the Republic of Ireland) and Northern Ireland, and moving successively southward as if reading sentences in a book from left to right, the SRDs (with alternate spellings or new names) and the country or counties in which each one occurs are as follows:

 Dunfanaghy - Donegal.
 Milford (Millford) - Donegal.
 Inishowen - Donegal.

 Glenties - Donegal
 Letterkenny - Donegal
 Stranorlar (Stranolar, Strandlar) - Donegal
 Strabane - Donegal, Tyrone
 Derry - Londonderry, Donegal
 Newtown - Londonderry
 Limavady - Londonderry
 Coleraine - Antrim, Londonderry
 Ballymoney - Antrim, Londonderry
 Ballymena - Antrim
 Ballycastle - Antrim
 Larne - Antrim

 Donegal - Donegal
 Castlederg - Tyrone
 Irvinestown - Cavan, Fermanagh, Tyrone
 Omagh - Tyrone
 Gortin - Tyrone
Gortin was abolished in 1889 and its land split between Omagh and Strabane.
 Cookstown - Tyrone
 Dungannon - Tyrone
 Magherafelt - Londonderry
 Antrim - Antrim
 Belfast - Antrim, Down
 Newtownards - Down

 Sligo - Sligo
 Ballyshannon - Donegal, Fermanagh, Leitrim
 Manor Hamilton (Manorhamilton) - Leitrim
 Enniskillen - Cavan, Fermanagh, Tyrone
 Lisnaskea - Cavan, Fermanagh
 Clones - Fermanagh, Monaghan
 Clogher - Monaghan, Tyrone
 Monaghan - Monaghan
 Armagh - Armagh, Tyrone
 Lurgan - Antrim, Armagh, Down
 Banbridge - Armagh, Down
 Lisburn - Antrim, Down
 Downpatrick - Down

 Dromore West - Sligo
 Tobercurry - Sligo
 Boyle - Leitrim, Roscommon, Sligo
 Carrick on Shannon - Leitrim, Roscommon
 Bawnboy - Cavan, Leitrim
 Mohill - Leitrim
 Cavan - Cavan
 Cootehill - Cavan, Monaghan
 Castleblayney (Castleblaney) - Armagh, Monaghan
 Carrickmacross - Monaghan
 Dundalk - Armagh, Louth, Monaghan
 Newry - Armagh, Down
 Kilkeel - Down

 Belmullet - Mayo
 Killala - Mayo
 Ballina - Mayo, Sligo
Ballina was reduced in size in 1850, creating Killala and Belmullet.
 Swineford (Swinford) - Mayo, Roscommon
 Castlerea (Castlereagh) - Mayo, Roscommon
 Strokestown - Leitrim, Roscommon
 Longford - Longford
 Granard - Cavan, Longford, Westmeath
 Oldcastle - Cavan, Meath
 Bailieborough (Bailieboro) - Cavan, Meath
 Kells (Ceanannus Mor in Irish) - Cavan, Meath
 Navan (An Uaimh in Irish) - Meath
 Ardee - Louth, Meath
 Drogheda - Louth, Meath

 Newport - Mayo
Newport was abolished in 1886 and its land merged into Westport.
 Westport - Mayo
 Castlebar - Mayo
 Ballinrobe - Galway, Mayo
 Claremorris - Mayo
 Tuam - Galway
 Glenamaddy (Glennamaddy) - Galway, Roscommon
 Mount Bellew (Mountbellew) - Galway
 Roscommon - Galway, Leitrim, Roscommon
 Athlone - Roscommon, Westmeath
 Ballymahon - Longford, Westmeath
 Mullingar - Westmeath
 Delvin (Castletowndelvin) - Meath, Westmeath
 Trim - Meath
 Dunshauglin - Dublin, Meath
 Balrothery - Dublin

 Clifden - Galway, Mayo
 Oughterard (Oughterand) - Galway, Mayo
 Galway - Galway
 Loughrea (Lougthrea) - Galway
 Ballinasloe - Galway, Roscommon
 Portumna (Portunna) - Galway
 Borrisokane - Tipperary
 Parsonstown (Birr) - Offaly, Tipperary
Parsonstown was renamed Birr after 1891.
 Tullamore - Offaly, Westmeath
 Mountmellick - Laois, Offaly
 Athy - Kildare, Laois
 Edenderry - Kildare, Meath, Offaly
 Naas - Dublin, Kildare, Wicklow
 Celbridge - Dublin, Kildare, Meath
 Dublin North - Dublin
 Dublin South - Dublin
Some Registration District lists and maps indicate a new SRD called Fingal for part of Dublin.
 Rathdown - Dublin, Wicklow

 Kilrush - Clare
 Killadysert - Clare
 Ennis - Clare
 Ennistimon (Ennistymon) - Clare
 Corrofin (Corofin) - Clare
 Ballyvaughan - Clare
 Gort - Clare, Galway
 Tulla - Clare
Tulla was merged into Scarriff between 1901 and 1911.
 Scarriff (Scariff) - Clare, Galway
 Nenagh - Tipperary, Galway
 Roscrea - Laois, Offaly, Tipperary
 Thurles - Tipperary
 Donaghmore - Laois
Donaghmore was abolished in 1887 and its land split between Roscrea, Abbeyleix, and Urlingford.
 Urlingford - Kilkenny, Laois, Tipperary
 Abbeyleix - Laois
 Castlecomer - Kilkenny
 Kilkenny - Kilkenny
 Carlow - Carlow, Laois
 Baltinglass - Carlow, Kildare, Wicklow
 Shillelag - Carlow, Wexford, Wicklow
 Gorey - Wexford
 Rathdrum - Wicklow

 Listowel - Kerry, Limerick
 Glin - Kerry, Limerick
Glin was abolished in 1892 and its land split between Listowel and Rathkeale.
 Newcastle - Limerick
 Rathkeale - Limerick
 Croom - Limerick
 Kilmallock - Cork, Limerick
 Limerick - Limerick, Clare
 Tipperary - Limerick, Tipperary
 Cashel - Tipperary
 Callan - Kilkenny, Tipperary
 Thomastown - Kilkenny
 New Ross - Carlow, Kilkenny, Wexford
 Enniscorthy - Carlow, Wexford
 Wexford - Wexford

 Dingle - Kerry
 Tralee - Kerry
 Killarney - Kerry
 Millstreet - Cork
 Kanturk - Cork, Limerick
 Mallow - Cork
 Mitchelstown - Cork, Limerick
 Fermoy - Cork
 Lismore - Cork, Waterford
 Clogheen - Tipperary, Waterford
 Clonmel - Tipperary, Waterford
 Dungarvan - Waterford
 Kilmacthomas (Kilmac Thomas) - Waterford
 Carrick on Suir - Kilkenny, Tipperary, Waterford
 Waterford - Kilkenny, Waterford

 Cahersiveen (Cahirciveen) - Kerry
 Kenmare - Kerry
 Macroom - Cork
 Cork - Cork
 Middleton - Cork
 Youghal - Cork, Waterford

 Castletown - Cork, Westmeath
 Bantry - Cork
 Dunmanway (Dunmanaway) - Cork
 Bandon - Cork
 Kinsale - Cork

 Skull - Cork
 Skibbereen - Cork
 Clonakilty - Cork

Within each SRD in Ireland are subdistricts.  Here are a few subdistricts (this is a non-exhaustive list):

 Achill
 Aghada
 Annacarriga
 Aran (aka Aran Islands)
 Ardfert
 Arklow
 Athenry
 Aughrim
 Bagenalstown
 Balla
 Ballincollig
 Ballindine
 Ballineen
 Ballyclogh (Ballyclough)
 Ballyconnell
 Ballycroy
 Ballyfeard
 Ballyhaunis
 Ballyhooly
 Ballymartle
 Ballynoe
 Bangor
 Belturbet
 Blackrock
 Blessington
 Boherboy
 Bray
 Carrickfergus
 Carrigallen
 Castlepollard
 Clondalkin
 Coole
 Donaghmoyne
 Donnybrook
 Dundrum
 Dunglow (Dungloe)
 Kildare
 Killiney
 Kingstown
 Leitrim
 Louth
 Maynooth
 Newbridge
 Newmarket
 Portadown
 Portlaoise
 Portrush
 Queenstown
 Rathmines
 Tanderagee
 Templemore
 Warrenpoint

Footnotes

 Registration Districts of Ireland, Michael J. Thompson, copyright 2009, 2012.  This document and its contents are made available for non‐commercial use only.

External links
 Status details for Registration District (A Vision of Britain)
 Registration Districts in England and Wales (1837-1974) (GENUKI/UK BMD)
 General Register Office for Scotland: List of Parishes and Registration Districts (GROS)
 Analysis of the Response to the second Consultation on Proposals to Improve and Modernise the Registration Service in Scotland (Scottish Executive)
 Registration Districts in Scotland (NRS)

Administrative divisions of Scotland
Administrative divisions of Wales
Administrative divisions of England